Il était une fois, il était deux fois (English: Once Upon a Time, Twice Upon a Time, Moroccan Arabic: كان حتى كان واحد المرة حْتى كان زوجْ دالمرات) is a 2007 Moroccan film directed by Bachir Skiredj in his directional debut. It was screened at the 9th edition of the Moroccan National Film Festival held in Tangier.

Synopsis 
Maarouf is a cobbler married to a Aisha, an abusive woman, who mistreats him, often attacking him physically. One day, in a fit of rage, Aisha attempts to hit her husband with a cobbler's hammer, but instead, her blow cracks the wall from which appears a genie that ejects Maarouf into a new life in the city of Orlando.

Cast 

 Bachir Skiredj
 Sanae Kamari
 Rachida Saâudi
 Emilio Jaramillo
 Even Jaramillo

References 

Moroccan drama films
2007 films